Rharb (sometimes Gharb, in Arabic:  "west") is a historical and geographical region in northern Morocco. This is a great plain, an area of about six thousand square kilometers in central Morocco, in northeast of Rabat and northwest of Meknes, bordered by the Atlantic Ocean and the hills of pre-Rif.
Regions of Morocco

History 
Ibn Khaldun - historian and diplomat of the North Africa from the 14th and 15th centuries - has described:

« [le calife almohade] établit les Riah dans le Habt et les Jochem dans la Tamesna, vaste plaine qui s'étend de Salé à         Marrakech. »

See also 

 Kenitra

References 

Geography of Morocco